MS Adzharistan was one of six Soviet s during the late 1920s built for the Black Sea State Shipping Company. During the Second World War, she was sunk by German aircraft in July 1941.

Description 
The four ships built in Leningrad were shorter than the pair built in Germany, but had more powerful engines. She had a pair of six-cylinder, two-stroke diesel engines, each driving a screw propeller, and the engines were rated at a total of 1,372 nominal horsepower. The ship had a designed capacity of 450 passengers.

Construction and career 
Adzharistan was originally named Adzharia and was renamed sometime in the 1930s. She was one of the four ships in the class that were constructed in 1928 at the Baltic Works shipyard in Leningrad. After completion the ship was assigned to the Black Sea State Shipping Company by Sovtorgflot with its port of registry at Odessa.

After the invasion of the Soviet Union on 22 June 1941 (Operation Barbarossa) by Nazi Germany and its allies, Adzharistan was used for military tasks. She was sunk by German bombers on 23 July.

References

Bibliography

Krim-class ocean liner
Ships built at the Baltic Shipyard
Ships sunk by German aircraft
World War II passenger ships of the Soviet Union